Logilvia is a genus of lichenized fungi in the family Pilocarpaceae. This is a monotypic genus, containing the single species Logilvia gilva.

References

Pilocarpaceae
Lichen genera
Monotypic Lecanorales genera
Taxa named by Antonín Vězda
Taxa described in 1986